is the first compilation album by solo singer and former Morning Musume and Petit Moni member Maki Goto.

This album features several songs with different versions from the originals. "Ai no Bakayarō" has a slightly different arrangement, while "Suki Sugite Baka Mitai" is Goto's solo version of the original DEF.DIVA song. "Daite yo! Please Go On" is a live version recorded at the Hello! Project 2005 Natsu no Kayou Show -'05 Selection! Collection!- concert, while "Sayonara no Love Song" and "Afurechau...Be in Love" are new arrangements that have a different character from the original versions.

Track listing 
 
 
 
 
 
 
 
 
 
 
 
 
 
 
 

Bonus Korean Tracks:

16. THANK YOU MEMORIES ('Suppin to Namida.' Korean Ver.) | THANK YOU MEMORIES ('スッピンと涙。'Korean Ver.)

17. PLEASE GO ON ('Daite yo! PLEASE GO ON' Korean Ver.) | PLEASE GO ON ('抱いてよ！PLEASE GO ON' Korean Ver.)

References

External links 
 Goto Maki Premium Best 1 entry on the Up-Front Works official website

2005 greatest hits albums
Maki Goto albums
Piccolo Town compilation albums